The Pacerailer was a prototype railbus, a vehicle consisting of a bus-style body on a four-wheeled railway-vehicle chassis, built by Charles Sadler Ashby's Sadler Rail Coach Company (SRC) in the 1960s.

Following the closure of Droxford station, on the Meon Valley Railway in Hampshire, both it and the track south to Wickham station were leased by SRC, who used the line to demonstrate the Pacerailer to potential buyers. A section of the line was rebuilt with a 1:10 incline to demonstrate the vehicle's abilities on steep gradients. 

There were problem with vandalism at the site, with the tracks intentionally blocked and points jammed in an effort to derail vehicles, and on 4 May 1970 the Pacerailer prototype was burned out and badly damaged. Ashby was in advanced negotiations to reopen the line between Cowes and Ryde on the Isle of Wight using Pacerailers. It was alleged that one of the Isle of Wight's bus companies was behind the vandalism and arson at Droxford. The underframe survives; as of 2022 it is currently located on the Isle of Wight Steam Railway, used as the structure for a pedestrian bridge.

Ashby died in February 1976 and SRC was dissolved in December 1976, having failed to sell the Pacerailer to any railway company.

A similar concept, the Pacer, was successfully developed by British Rail in the 1980s.

References

Bibliography

External links 

  - Film of the Sadler Pacerailer by British Movietone News, Issue 1964 23 January 1967
 Getty Images photograph of Ashby with the Pacerailer
 2007 newspaper letter with details of the arson incident

Railcars of the United Kingdom
Prototypes
 Scrapped locomotives
Train-related introductions in 1967